Luechai Rutdit (born 26 May 1960) is a former Thai naval officer. He served as commander-in-chief of the Royal Thai Navy from 1 October 2018 to 30 September 2020. Chatchai Sriworakan was appointed as his successor.

References 

Living people
1960 births
Place of birth missing (living people)
Luechai Rutdit
Luechai Rutdit
Luechai Rutdit